DeeAndre Hulett (born December 29, 1980) is an American retired professional basketball player.

Hulett averaged 24.2 points, 13.1 rebounds and 4 blocks per game in his senior year of high school at Arthur Hill, and received all-state honors. After playing collegiately at College of the Sequoias from 1998–99, he signed with the Las Vegas Silver Bandits of the International Basketball League. He was selected by the Toronto Raptors in the second round (46th overall) of the 2000 NBA Draft. However, Hulett never played in an NBA game, making him 1 of 8 players from the 2000 NBA Draft to never play in the league.

Hulett attended Arthur Hill High School and was the second runner-up for Mr. Basketball of Michigan in 1998.

On March 23, 2001, Hulett signed with the St. Louis Swarm of the International Basketball League. Later that day, he scored a game-high 28 points in a 106–100 overtime victory against the Gary Steelheads.

Hulett was drafted in the third round (19th overall) by the Greenville Groove in the inaugural National Basketball Developmental League draft in 2001. He played 34 games with 27 starts and averaged 11.1 points and 3.9 rebounds per game for Greenville during the 2001–02 season. On February 22, 2002, Hulett was released for "repeated violations of league policy".

He played for Santiago's Los Pepines basketball club in the Dominican Republic.

Notes

External links
 DeeAndre Hulett at latinbasket.com

1980 births
Living people
African-American basketball players
American expatriate basketball people in Germany
American expatriate basketball people in Mexico
American expatriate basketball people in the Dominican Republic
American men's basketball players
Basketball players from Michigan
College of the Sequoias alumni
Greenville Groove players
Junior college men's basketball players in the United States
Las Vegas Silver Bandits players
Potros ITSON de Obregón players
Shooting guards
Sportspeople from Saginaw, Michigan
St. Louis Swarm players
Toronto Raptors draft picks
21st-century African-American sportspeople
20th-century African-American people